The following is a list of the Nigeria national football team's competitive records and statistics.

Individual records

Player records

Players in bold are still active with Nigeria.

Most appearances

Top goalscorers

Manager records

Team records

Competition records

FIFA World Cup record

Notes

African Cup of Nations

*Denotes draws including knockout matches decided via a penalty shoot-out.
**Red border colour indicates tournament was held on home soil.

African Nations Championship

WAFU Nations Cup record

FIFA Confederations Cup

Olympic Games record

African Games

Football at the African Games has been an under-23 tournament since 1991.

Head-to-head record 
The following table summarizes the all-time record for the Nigeria national football team. Nigeria has played matches against 92 current and former national teams, with the latest result, a loss against  on 26 June 2018.

 Win %- Number of wins divided by number of games played (ties count as half a win)
 Defunct nations are listed in Italics (nations that changed names are listed under their most recent name; nations that have separated into two or more new nations are listed as defunct)
Table lists only full senior team competitions.  Olympics, underage competition and African Nations Championship matches are excluded
Matches which are won after extra time with penalty kicks are listed as draws, per official FIFA designation.

References

External links 
 Nigeria National Football Team List of Results - RSSSF.com
 Nigeria National Football Team List of Results - 11v11.com
 History of Jalco Cup 1951-1959 - RSSF.com
 History of Dr. Kwame Nkrumah Cup 1959-1967 - RSSF.com
 History of Azikiwe Cup 1961-1967 - RSSF.com

Nigeria national football team
National association football team records and statistics